Friendly Fire is the second album by the British singer/songwriter Shara Nelson. It was released in 1995 on Cooltempo Records.

The album contains Nelson's UK Top 30 hit, "Rough with the Smooth".

Critical reception

The Irish Times wrote that "Shara Nelson's voice in itself would seduce any listener but when accompanied by superior song writing and pristine production, the results are even more tantalising." The Independent noted that "anyone admiring of Portishead's sparse tripped-out soundscapes, but left thirsty by their lack of genuine soul or authenticity, will be quenched by these sumptuous songs, which make as much sense at three in the afternoon as three in the morning."

Track listing
Lyrics by Shara Nelson
 "Rough with the Smooth" (Nelson, Ashley Beedle, Marc Woodford)
 "Moving On" (Nelson, Doug Wimbish, Skip McDonald)
 "Poetry" (Nelson, Lucas Secon)
 "I Fell (So You Could Catch Me)" (Nelson, David Arnold)
 "Footprint" (Nelson, Dave Henley, Justin Langlands)
 "Between the Lines" (Nelson, David Arnold)
 "After You" (Nelson, Jah Wobble)
 "Exit One" (Nelson, Lucas Secon)
 "Friendly Fire" (Nelson, Doug Wimbish, Skip McDonald)
 "Keeping Out the Cold/Segabeat" (Nelson, Bob Stanley, Pete Wiggs/Nelson)

Personnel
Shara Nelson - lead vocals
The London Session Orchestra - strings
Gavyn Wright - orchestra leader
Martin Virgo - programming
Nick Ingman - string arrangements
Wil Malone - string arrangement on "Footprint"
Jah Wobble - bass on "After You"
DJ Crystl - scratches on "Friendly Fire"
Steven Dante - backing vocals on "Rough with the Smooth"
Lain Gray, Tee Green - backing vocals on "Moving On" and "Poetry"

Charts

References

1995 albums
Shara Nelson albums
Cooltempo Records albums
Albums produced by Mike Peden